Nemanja Ivanović (born 14 May 1997) is a Serbian professional football striker, who plays for Mladost Lučani in the Serbian SuperLiga.

Career
Ivanović is a product of Red Star Belgrade youth sportive school. 

In January 2019, Ivanović signed a two years contract with FC Zorya Luhansk from the Ukrainian Premier League.

References

External links
 
 Nemanja Ivanović stats at srbijafudbal.com

1997 births
Living people
Footballers from Belgrade
Association football forwards
Serbian footballers
FK Jagodina players
FK Sinđelić Beograd players
FC Zorya Luhansk players
FK Zlatibor Čajetina players
FK Mladost Lučani players
Ukrainian Premier League players
Serbian SuperLiga players
Serbian First League players
Serbian expatriate footballers
Expatriate footballers in Ukraine
Serbian expatriate sportspeople in Ukraine